Afterwards may refer to:

 Afterwards (1928 film), a British silent drama film
 Afterwards (2008 film), a psychological thriller film
 Afterwards (2017 film), a Canadian drama film
 Afterwards (play), a 1933 mystery play by Walter C. Hackett
 Afterwards, a novel by Rosamund Lupton

See also
 Afterword, a literary device at the end of a piece of literature